Kurt Weinzierl (15 April 1931 in Innsbruck, Austria – 10 October 2008 in Munich, Germany) was an Austrian television actor. He played Franz Jägerstätter in the biopic of 1971, but is most famous for his satirical portrayal of the head of the Viennese police forces in Kottan ermittelt.

Partial filmography

 Holiday am Wörthersee (1956) – Sieglindes Bräutigam
 Der Bauer als Millionär (1961) – Habakuk (uncredited)
 Als ich beim Käthele im Wald war (1963) – Vetter Konrad
 The Man in the Rushes (1978) – Schemnitzky
 Der Preis fürs Überleben (1980)
 Musik auf dem Lande (1980) – Guido Renner
 Derrick (1980–1996, TV Series) – Direktor / Karl Podewil / Hotelbesitzer / Herr Heuer / Musiklehrer / Robert / Hugo Dornwall
  (1981) – Dr. Breslauer
 Kottan ermittelt (1981–1983, TV Series) – Oberst Heribert Pilch
 Zeitgenossen (1982)
 Mit mir nicht, du Knallkopp (1983) – Rufus Schubiak
 Die Frau mit dem roten Hut (1984) – Film producer
  (1984)
  (1984) – Schuldirektor
  (1984)
 Seitenstechen (1985) – Barber
  (1985) – Pater Keynes
 Forget Mozart (1985) – Arzt
 Die Einsteiger (1985) – Trainer / Sheriff / Archäologe / Louis XIV. / Pianist / Nero
 Geld oder Leber! (1986) – Gefängniswärter
  (1986) – Kommissar in Wien
 Smaragd (1987)
 Ein Schloß am Wörthersee (1990–1993, TV Series) – Oberinspektor Grasshofer
 The Nasty Girl (1990) – Priest (uncredited)
  (1993) – Bertram
 Das geborgte Nest (1995)
 Das Zauberbuch (1996) – King
 Alle für die Mafia (1998) – Karl Wielander
 Professor Niedlich (2001)
 Echte Wiener – Die Sackbauer-Saga (2008) – Vitus Egger (final film role)

External links

Hannelore Dietrich Agency Munich 

1931 births
2008 deaths
Austrian male television actors
20th-century Austrian male actors
21st-century Austrian male actors